The 300 m rifle three positions event was one of five free rifle events of the competitions in the Shooting at the 1900 Summer Olympics events in Paris. They were held from August 3 to August 5, 1900. 30 shooters from 6 nations competed, with five shooters per team. Medals were given for individual high scores in each of the three positions, overall individual high scores, and the scores of the five shooters were summed to give a team score. The three positions event was won by Emil Kellenberger of Switzerland. Anders Peter Nielsen of Denmark took silver, while Ole Østmo of Norway and Paul Van Asbroeck of Belgium tied for bronze.

Background

This was the first appearance of the men's 300 metre three-positions rifle event, which was held 11 times between 1900 and 1972. Two of the three world champions since the world championships began in 1897 were competing: Achille Paroche of France (1898) and Lars Jørgen Madsen of Denmark (1899); of the total nine medalists to date, seven competed at the Olympics. The Olympic event doubled as the 1900 world championship.

Competition format

The competition had each shooter fire 120 shots, 40 shots in each of three positions: prone, kneeling, and standing. The target was 1 metre in diameter, with 10 scoring rings; targets were set at a distance of 300 metres. Thus, the maximum score possible was 1200 points. Medals were also awarded for team results, adding the individual three-positions scores together. For the only time in Olympic history, medals were awarded for scores in each of the three positions.

Records

Prior to the competition, the existing world and Olympic records were as follows.

Emil Kellenberger set the initial Olympic record for the 120-shot format at 930 points.

Schedule

Results

The scores from the three positions were summed, giving a total possible of 1200 points.

References

 International Olympic Committee medal winners database
 De Wael, Herman. Herman's Full Olympians: "Shooting 1900". Accessed 3 March 2006.
 

Men's rifle military three positions
Men's 300m 3 positions